Heavy Petting may refer to:

Film and television
Heavy Petting (2007 film), American dog comedy
Heavy Petting (1989 film), American celebrity documentary
Heavy Petting (TV series), Indian series about pets

Music
Heavy Petting (album), 1997 album by Bad Manners

See also
No Heavy Petting, 1976 album by UFO
Heavy Petting Zoo, 1996 album by NOFX